Fritz Aeppli was a Swiss footballer who played for FC Basel. He played mainly in the position of forward.

Between the years 1912 and 1916 Aeppli played a total of 24 games for Basel scoring a total of 11 goals; 17 of these games were in the Swiss Serie A, one in the Anglo-Cup and six were friendly games. He scored six goal in the domestic league, the others were scored during the test games.

In the 1912–13 season Basel won the Anglo-Cup. Bredscheider was part of the team that won the final on 29 June 1913 in the Hardau Stadium, Zürich against FC Weissenbühl Bern 5–0.

Bibliography
 Rotblau: Jahrbuch Saison 2017/2018. Publisher: FC Basel Marketing AG.

References

FC Basel players
Swiss men's footballers
Association football forwards
Year of birth missing
Year of death missing